Caerwys Tufa is a Site of Special Scientific Interest in the preserved county of Clwyd, north Wales.

Tufa, a very soft limestone that was once used to make cement, and later, widely used in alpine gardens, was extracted at Caerwys Tufa Quarry.

See also
List of Sites of Special Scientific Interest in Clwyd

References

Sites of Special Scientific Interest in Clwyd
Caerwys